Remy Lai is an author and illustrator of children's books and middle-grade graphic novels. She was born Indonesia, grew up in Singapore, and currently lives in Brisbane. Her books tell stories of young Chinese immigrants and Chinese Australians.

Awards 

 2020 Golden Kite Sid Fleischman Humor Award for Pie in the Sky
 2020 Golden Kite Honor Book in Young Reader and Middle Grade Fiction for Pie in the Sky
2021 Prime Minister's Literary Award for Children's Literature, joint winner for Fly on the Wall

Bibliography 

 Pie in the Sky (Henry Holt, 2019)
 Fly on the Wall (Henry Holt, 2020)
 Pawcasso (Henry Holt, 2021)
 Surviving the Wild, Volume 1: Star the Elephant (Henry Holt, 2022)
 Surviving the Wild, Volume 2: Rainbow the Koala (Henry Holt, 2022)

References

External links 

 Official website

Living people
Year of birth missing (living people)
Australian women children's writers
Australian writers of young adult literature